Madonna Sebastian is an Indian actress and playback singer who primarily works in Malayalam and Tamil films. She made her acting debut with 2015 Malayalam film Premam, and Tamil with Kadhalum Kadandhu Pogum (2016), and in Telugu with Premam (2016).

She has appeared in many successful films including Premam (2015), King Liar (2016), Pa Paandi (2017),  Kavan (2017), Iblis (2018), Virus (2019), Brother's Day (2019), Kotigobba 3 (2021) and Shyam Singha Roy (2021).

Personal life 
Sebastian was born to Babycd Devasia and Shyla Babycd at Cherupuzha, Kannur, India and raised in Angamaly. She did her higher studies at St Peter's Senior Secondary School, Kadayiruppu. She did a one-year Master Training course at START Kozhikode. She graduated with a Bachelor of Commerce from Christ University, Bangalore.

Career

Films 
Madonna Sebastian has sung tracks for composers like Deepak Dev and Gopi Sunder. Her participation in Malayalam musical program Music Mojo, After seeing her host a program for Surya TV, director Alphonse Putharen called her to audition for his romantic film Premam. Even though she was not interested in acting, she auditioned and was considered for the role of Mary. However, on her insistence that she related more with Celine, Mary's role was given to Anupama Parameswaran.

After Premam, she then made her Tamil debut opposite Vijay Sethupathi in Kadhalum Kadandhu Pogum (2016), the film makes mixed to positive reviews from critics, and became an average hit at box office. Her second Malayalam movie was King Liar (2016), in which she starred opposite Dileep. The film received mixed reviews and became a moderate success. Then Sebastian reprised her role for the Telugu remake of Premam with Naga Chaitanya and Shruti Hassan replacing Nivin Pauly and Sai Pallavi, respectively, and marking her debut in Telugu cinema. though the film was an average success.

In 2017, Sebastian has also paired up with Vijay Sethupathi again after her Tamil debut with him in the Tamil film Kavan directed by K. V. Anand. the film makes mixed to highly positive reviews from critics. Then she appeared in Dhanush's directorial debut Power Paandi where she played the role of "Young Poonthendral". Both the films were commercially successful at Box office.

In 2018, Sebastian's first release is a Tamil movie Junga, she landed in an extended cameo appearance in the film, opposite Vijay Sethupathi, marking collaboration with him for the third time, directed by Gokul. Her second release is a Malayalam film Iblis, opposite Asif Ali directed by Rohit VS. the film was a commercial success.

In 2019, her first release was a multi-starrer medical thriller film titled Virus, in which she played the role of Dr.Sara Yakub, directed by Aashiq Abu. The film becomes a major commercial success, and became one of the top 25 Malayalam films of decade.  And second release was Brother's Day, opposite Prithviraj Sukumaran, directed by Kalabhavan Shajohn. The film becomes an blockbuster at the box-office.

Her only release in 2020 was Vaanam Kottattum, opposite Vikram Prabhu, directed by Dhana Sekaran. the film receives mixed to positive reviews, but became a commercial failure.

In 2021, Sebastian made her Kannada debut with Kottigobba 3, opposite Sudeep, directed by Shiva Karthik. The film was released by theatrically on October 15, 2021, the film makes a mixed reviews and performed well in Box-office collection. Her second release was Shyam Singha Roy starring Nani, directed by Rahul Sankrityan. The film was received mixed to positive reviews from both critics and audience. and becomes a box-office hit.

In 2022, her first release Kombu Vatcha Singamda, opposite Sasikumar, directed by S.R. Prabhakaran. the film received mixed to negative reviews from critics and audience, and was a flop at the box-office. Later she made her digital streaming debut with a Tamil webseries Kaiyum Kalavum, which was released on Sony LIV and received generally positive reviews from critics.

As of February 2023, she is currently filming for her upcoming projects, including a webseries Anger Tales, which was scheduled to release on Disney+ Hotstar, and for her upcoming Malayalam films Identity, opposite  Tovino Thomas, and Padmini, starring Kunchacko Boban .

Music 
From childhood, Sebastian had a strong interest in music. A trained singer in Carnatic and Western music, she has performed for Music Mojo of Kappa TV and numerous popular Malayalam music directors and singers. In 2015, she sang a song titled Raavukalil for the movie You Too Brutus with musical backing from Roby Abraham. The pair subsequently formed a band named Everafter.

In January 2016, the band released online its first music video titled 'Veruthe'.  In 2016, she also sang a song for the film Valleem Thetti Pulleem Thetti titled 'Pularkalam Pole'. Sebastian has also sung the jingle composed by Deepak Dev for Hit 96.7, a radio station based in Dubai.

Filmography

Webseries

Discography

Awards and nominations

References

External links 
 

Actresses in Malayalam cinema
Living people
Actresses from Kochi
Indian film actresses
Actresses in Tamil cinema
21st-century Indian actresses
Actresses in Telugu cinema
People from Kannur district
Christ University alumni
Actresses in Kannada cinema
Year of birth missing (living people)